Ouellet is a French Canadian surname common in Quebec; it traces back to a common ancestor, René Hoûallet, who came to New France at Rivière-Ouelle in the 17th century. The surname exists also in other forms: Ouellette, Ouellon, Houal(l)et, Willett(e).

Notable people with the name include:
 André Ouellet (b. 1939), Canadian politician and Minister of Foreign Affairs
 Carl Ouellet (b. 1967), Canadian professional wrestler
 Christian Ouellet (b. 1934), Canadian politician
 David George Ouellet (1944–1967), American Medal of Honor recipient
 Fernand Ouellet (b. 1926), Canadian author and educator
 Henri Roger Ouellet (1938–1999), Canadian ornithologist
 Jean-Pierre Ouellet (b. 1946), Canadian politician from New Brunswick
 Maili-Jade Ouellet (b. 2002), Canadian chess player
 Marc Ouellet (b. 1944), Roman Catholic Cardinal 
 Martine Ouellet (b. 1969), Canadian politician and leader of the Bloc Québécois 
 Maryse Ouellet (b. 1983), Canadian professional wrestler
 Maxime Ouellet (b. 1981), Canadian ice hockey player
 Michel Ouellet (b. 1982), Canadian ice hockey player
 Xavier Ouellet (b. 1993), Canadian ice hockey player

See also
 USS Ouellet (FF-1077)
 Ouellette (disambiguation)

Notes